Shmuel "Shmulik" Malul (born 3 April 1993) is an Israeli footballer who plays as a left-back for Isareli club Hapoel Ramat Gan.

Notes

1994 births
Living people
Israeli Mizrahi Jews
Israeli Sephardi Jews
Israeli footballers
Beitar Nes Tubruk F.C. players
Maccabi Petah Tikva F.C. players
Beitar Jerusalem F.C. players
Hapoel Acre F.C. players
Hapoel Ramat Gan F.C. players
Israeli Premier League players
Footballers from Central District (Israel)
Israeli people of Moroccan-Jewish descent
Association football defenders